In numerical linear algebra, the Cuthill–McKee algorithm (CM), named after Elizabeth Cuthill and James McKee, is an algorithm to permute a sparse matrix that has a symmetric sparsity pattern into a   band matrix form with a small bandwidth. The reverse Cuthill–McKee algorithm  (RCM)  due to Alan George and Joseph Liu is the same algorithm but with the resulting index numbers reversed.

The Cuthill McKee algorithm is a variant of the standard breadth-first search
algorithm used in graph algorithms. It starts with a peripheral node and then
generates levels  for  until all nodes
are exhausted. The set  is created from set 
These 
nodes are ordered according to predecessors and degree.

Algorithm

Given a symmetric  matrix we visualize the matrix as the adjacency matrix of a graph. The Cuthill–McKee algorithm is then a relabeling of the vertices of the graph to reduce the bandwidth of the adjacency matrix.

The algorithm produces an ordered n-tuple  of vertices which is the new order of the vertices.

First we choose a peripheral vertex (the vertex with the lowest degree)  and set .

Then for  we iterate the following steps while 

Sort  ascending by minimum predecessor (the already-visited neighbor with the earliest position in R), and as a tiebreak ascending by vertex degree.
Append  to the Result set .

In other words, number the vertices according to a particular level structure (computed by breadth-first search) where the vertices in each level are visited in order of their predecessor's numbering from lowest to highest. Where the predecessors are the same, vertices are distinguished by degree (again ordered from lowest to highest).

See also
Graph bandwidth
Sparse matrix

References

 Cuthill–McKee documentation for the Boost C++ Libraries.
 A detailed description of the Cuthill–McKee algorithm.
 symrcm MATLAB's implementation of RCM.
 reverse_cuthill_mckee RCM routine from SciPy written in Cython.

Matrix theory
Graph algorithms
Sparse matrices